CBC Podcast Showcase is a radio program on broadcast on CBC Radio One, focusing on the Canadian Broadcasting Corporation's original podcast productions. It is hosted by Nana aba Duncan.

It features excerpts from the podcasts which include radio documentaries and audio dramas.

External link
 Official website

CBC Radio One programs
2020 radio programme debuts
Canadian talk radio programs